The R568 road is a regional road on the Iveragh Peninsula in County Kerry, Ireland. It travels from the N70 road at Sneem to the N71 at Moll's Gap.

References

Regional roads in the Republic of Ireland
Roads in County Kerry